The Western City Gate, also known as the Genex Tower is a 36-story skyscraper in Belgrade, Serbia, which was designed in 1977 by  in the brutalist style. It is formed by two towers connected with a two-story bridge and revolving restaurant at the top.

The building is designed to resemble a high-rise gate greeting people arriving in the city from the West (the road from Belgrade Nikola Tesla Airport to the city centre leads this way). Disputed and criticized during the designing and construction process, the building is today a dominant landmark in Belgrade.

One of the towers was occupied by the state-owned Genex Group. The tower got its popular name "Genex" after this group, while its official title remains Western City Gate. The second, taller tower, is residential. The tower formerly occupied by the Genex company is empty, while the residential tower is still home to scores of people. The revolving mechanism under the restaurant on top never became operational.

In November 2021, the building was declared a cultural monument and placed under protection. The declaration refers to the building as an "urban lighthouse" and calls it the most striking motif of New Belgrade, and a visual benchmark for the entirety of the capital.

Location 
The building is located in the municipality of New Belgrade, in the 41-43 Narodnih heroja Street. It is actually situated at the corner of the street and the European route E75. West of the gate are the neighborhoods of Studentski Grad and Tošin Bunar, while Fontana is to the north. In the New Belgrade's blocks numeration system, the building belongs to the Block 33.

History 
In the late 1960s, architect  was given a task of projecting a 12-floor building and the head offices of the local community of Sutjeska, a sub-municipal administrative unit, on Narodnih heroja Street. Mitrović suggested two connected and much taller buildings which would make a recognizable symbol of the capital city. A fierce opposition, disagreements and disputes ensued, but Mitrović was persistent in his idea, giving detailed and exhaustive explanations in front of the numerous commissions. He was finally given the green light and the foundations were laid in 1971. The towers were built by the "Rad" construction company.

Nevertheless, the project met with distrust and was disputed all the time the construction was on. One of the rare colleagues who publicly supported Mitrović was Stojan Maksimović, who several years later designed another Belgrade's landmark, the Sava Centar. But the opposition continued in the next years. Even in the 2010s, a famous caricature by Ivo Kušanić in the daily Politika is still being mentioned and reproduced. It shows a gallows next to the building and the text: Who are these gallows for? For the architect!

"Generalexport", the company which owned the building went bankrupt in 2015, which was confirmed by the court in March 2017. The commercial half of the tower, with the related garage space, was offered for sale by the bankruptcy manager on 23 May 2022. Asked price was RSD2 billion (€17 million), but no one made an offer. In July 2022 it was offered again, this time for RSD1.46 billion (€12.4 million), or 35% of estimated worth (RSD4.17 billion or €35.5 million).

By the end of 2022, with the third sale attempt—and the property now listed for RSD834.6 million dinars (€7 million or €400 per m2)—scheduled for 6 February 2023, residents, citizens and public figures began to protest the sale, offering ideas for the building's future. Building manager, and a group of architects and economists, proposed that state takes over the building due to its importance, and to transform it into the Tesla Tower, "oasis of spirit, culture and architecture". Five floors were be adapted into the Nikola Tesla Museum, which would move into the building. With added science and technology centers, libraries, concert halls, galleries and bookshops, it would make a cultural and educational "Disneyland", opened non-stop.

Coalition Zajedno also suggested that state should use its pre-emption right to purchase the building, converting its use to an academic campus by naming the University of Belgrade as an administrator while also employing students (architecture, interior design, construction) to adapt the building. A group of electrical engineers suggested addition of Mihajlo Pupin to the joint museum with Tesla, creation of experimental labs and recreation of the Wardenclyffe Tower at the top of Western City Gate. Do not let Belgrade drown political party also supported state ownership of the building. Residents announced blockade of the city's central bridge, Gazela, protesting the sale.

After many years, on 12 January 2023, the digital clock display which is located at the top, between two towers, was repaired and became operational.

At the public sale on 6 February 2023, the commercial part of the property was purchased by the Belgrade-based hospitality entrepreneur Aleksandar Kajmaković, nicknamed Aca Bosanac, for RSD2.4 billion (~€20 million), three times its listed price. Kajmaković's company Eureka bar, which reportedly outbid six other entities vying for the property, owns numerous hospitality venues around Belgrade such as the traditional Skadarlija kafanas Tri šešira, Dva jelena, and Zlatni bokal, eatery Boutique, and Lafayette cabaret nightclub Police had to intervene as few members of the opposition hеckled the bidding.

Kajmaković is connected to major criminal clans in Serbia, being a right-hand man of the "controversial businessmen" . He was also apprehended by the police as part of the process against the  top Serbian gang kingpin  for suspicion of Kajmaković acting as the legal owner of Belivuk's properties which were safeguarded by the Belivuk's gang members, and for money laundering. A bomb was placed under Kajmaković's car in 2002 in Budva, Montenegro. Because of his history, the opposition considers Kajmaković a front for the real owner, and called for the annulment of the sale due to the general infringement of the entire process.

Architecture 
The two towers which make up the building are not the same height. The two buildings have serve different functions, with the taller one serving as a residential tower with 30 floors and the shorter tower housing businesses within its 26 floors. The bridge connects them at the 26th floor.

The building was designed in the brutalist style, with some elements of structuralism and constructivism. It is considered a prime representative of the brutalist architecture in Serbia and one of the best of its style built in the 1960s and the 1970s in the world. The treatment of the form and details is slightly associating the building with postmodernism and is today one of the rare surviving representatives of this style's early period in Serbia. The artistic expression of the gate marked an entire era in Serbian architecture.

Commission which declared the building a cultural monument prized the simplicity of solutions, proportional order of two towers and the cylindrical top extension with the rotating mechanism, located above the central axis of the complex. The commission also described the design as specific and bold architectural creation, commending mural, too.

The building was featured in the New York's Museum of Modern Art 2018-2019 exhibition exploring the architecture of the former Yugoslavia, Toward a Concrete Utopia: Architecture in Yugoslavia, 1948–1980.

Mural 
In 1979, Lazar Vujaklija painted a mural at the entrance. The mural covers the façade and the ceiling above the entrance. It was one of the first murals in Belgrade, predated by the 1970 mural painted on a building in the Bulevar Revolucije, also done by Vujaklija. Another work was added in the 2010s, described by the architects as a "graffiti, which is unsuitable and not a work of art". After a reaction from the architects, the author of the graffiti decided to paint it over, in an agreement with Mihajlo Mitrović's daughter who inherited the author's rights.

Protection 
The building is placed under the preliminary protection. It means it should be treated as if it were protected until the final decision about the protection is made. Association of Serbian Architects in 2019 filed a motion for Western City Gate to become a fully protected cultural monument. On 3 November 2021, the building was declared a cultural monument.

Local community 
The local community of Sutjeska had a population of 5,067 in 1981 and 5,187 in 1991. By the time of the 2002 census, it was renamed to the Local Community of Western Gate, after the building, and had a population of 4,278. It was later annexed to the neighboring local community of Fontana.

Gallery

See also 
 Gates of Belgrade
 List of tallest buildings in Serbia
 Trellick Tower and Balfron Tower, blocks of flats in London of similar design

References

External links 
 

Office buildings completed in 1980
Residential buildings completed in 1980
Brutalist architecture
Buildings and structures in Belgrade
Buildings and structures with revolving restaurants
Gates
Skyscrapers in Serbia
Towers in Serbia
Twin towers
New Belgrade